If I Have to Stand Alone is the debut album by Hi-NRG and house singer Lonnie Gordon, released in 1990 on Supreme Records. It includes Gordon's breakthrough hit "Happenin' All Over Again", which was a top 10 hit in the UK and Ireland. However, the two follow-up singles, "Beyond Your Wildest Dreams" and "If I Have to Stand Alone" did not fare as well. The album was released in parts of continental Europe in late 1990, and Japan and Australia in early 1991, albeit in limited quantity, and wasn't released in the UK until a Cherry Pop reissue in 2009.

Background and production
Most of the album was produced by British hitmaking team Stock Aitken Waterman or their associates Phil Harding and Ian Curnow. The album also includes Gordon's debut single for the label, "It's Not Over", which was released in September 1989. The album incorporates Stock Aitken Waterman's typical Europop sound, but also adding influences of the Italo house scene that was big in the UK charts in late 1989/1990.

Gordon recorded two more tracks which were not included on the album: "How Could He Do This to Me" (produced by Stock Aitken Waterman, and originally the planned follow-up to "Happenin' All Over Again"), and "Just a Matter of Time" (produced by Harding and Curnow). The former was later issued in the late 1990s on a dance compilation. Both were later released through iTunes in 2009.

Critical reception
In July 2018, Mark Elliot of Classic Pop considered If I Have to Stand Alone as the 12th best album ever produced by Stock Aitken Waterman and lamented about the poor chart performances of the last two singles. A review published in 2021 on the Pop Rescue site gave the album three stars out of five, adding that it is curious that "Happenin' All Over Again" was the only hit single from the album, since SAW and their team are highly recognisable in this work which uses "a few drums sequences, synths, samples, or vocal styles, that were incorporated into what became hits for Kylie, Sonia, and Big Fun throughout this album". The review also noted Gordon's powerful vocals which perfectly fit with dance songs, praised many tracks but considered "Best of Friends", "I Need You" and "Right Before My Eyes" as the weakest songs from the album.

Track listing
All songs written by Stock, Aitken & Waterman, except where noted.
"If I Have to Stand Alone" 3:25
"Happenin' All Over Again" 3:21
"Better Off Without You" 3:41
"Beyond Your Wildest Dreams" 6:48
"I Need You" (Bill Clift, Phil Harding, Ian Curnow) 4:07
"That's No Reason" 3:27
"Best of Friends" 4:00
"It's Not Over" (Bruce Gray, Bruce Hawes) 3:51
"Watching You" (Lonnie Gordon) 3:36
"Helpless Hearts" (Clift) 3:32
"Right Before My Eyes" (NY Mix) [Bonus track on CD editions] (Alexandra Forbes, Michael Zager) 5:47

2009 Special Edition 

In April 2009, UK label Cherry Pop reissued the album, including several bonus tracks, marking the first time for the album to be available worldwide. The reissue includes "How Could He Do This to Me", a track Gordon recorded for the album but was not originally included, as well as several remixes, some of them previously unreleased.

Track listing

"If I Have to Stand Alone" 
"Happenin' All Over Again"
"Better Off Without You" 
"Beyond Your Wildest Dreams" 
"I Need You" 
"That's No Reason" 
"Best of Friends" 
"It's Not Over (Let No Man Put Asunder)" 
"Watching You"
"Helpless Hearts"

Bonus tracks
"How Could He Do This to Me" (7" Mix)
"Happenin' All Over Again" (Tony King 1990 Mix) 
"If I Have to Stand Alone" (Original 12" Mix) 
"Better Off Without You" (Extended Version) 
"Happenin' All Over Again" (Dave Ford 1990 Mix) 
"How Could He Do This to Me" (Extended Version) 
"Best of Friends" (Extended Version)

Personnel
Adapted from AllMusic.

Matt Aitken – guitar, keyboards
Rodney Ascue – mixing, producer
Patrick Boothe	– background vocals
Bill Clift – background vocals
Ian Curnow – drums, engineer, keyboards, mixing, producer
Paul Dakeyne – producer
Peter Day – engineer
Gordon Dennis – assistant engineer
Richard Dowling – assistant engineer
Dave Ford – mixing
Alan Friedman – programming
Dillon Gallagher – assistant engineer
Julian Gingell – assistant engineer
Lonnie Gordon – primary artist
Peter Hammond – mixing
Phil Harding – bass, engineer, mixing, producer
Karen Hewitt – engineer
Tony King – remixing
A. Linn – drums
Chris McDonnell – assistant engineer
Mae McKenna – background vocals
John Michael Palmer – design, remastering
John Parthum – assistant engineer
Les Sharma – assistant engineer
Mike Stock – keyboards, background vocals
Miriam Stockley – background vocals
Barry Stone – assistant engineer
Philip Todd – saxophone
Yvonne Turner – mixing, producer, background vocals
Paul Waterman – assistant engineer
Russell Young – photography

Charts

References

1991 debut albums
Lonnie Gordon albums
House music albums by American artists
Albums produced by Stock Aitken Waterman